ATAC-seq (Assay for Transposase-Accessible Chromatin using sequencing) is a technique used in molecular biology to assess genome-wide chromatin accessibility. In 2013, the technique was first described as an alternative advanced method for MNase-seq, FAIRE-Seq and DNase-Seq. ATAC-seq is a faster and more sensitive analysis of the epigenome than DNase-seq or MNase-seq.

Description
ATAC-seq identifies accessible DNA regions by probing open chromatin with hyperactive mutant Tn5 Transposase that inserts sequencing adapters into open regions of the genome. While naturally occurring transposases have a low level of activity, ATAC-seq employs the mutated hyperactive transposase. In a process called "tagmentation", Tn5 transposase cleaves and tags double-stranded DNA with sequencing adaptors. The tagged DNA fragments are then purified, PCR-amplified, and sequenced using next-generation sequencing. Sequencing reads can then be used to infer regions of increased accessibility as well as to map regions of transcription factor binding sites and nucleosome positions. The number of reads for a region correlate with how open that chromatin is, at single nucleotide resolution. ATAC-seq requires no sonication or phenol-chloroform extraction like FAIRE-seq; no antibodies like ChIP-seq; and no sensitive enzymatic digestion like MNase-seq or DNase-seq. ATAC-seq preparation can be completed in under three hours.

Applications 

ATAC-Seq analysis is used to investigate a number of chromatin-accessibility signatures. The most common use is nucleosome mapping experiments, but it can be applied to mapping transcription factor binding sites, adapted to map DNA methylation sites, or combined with sequencing techniques.

The utility of high-resolution enhancer mapping ranges from studying the evolutionary divergence of enhancer usage (e.g. between chimps and humans) during development and uncovering a lineage-specific enhancer map used during blood cell differentiation.

ATAC-Seq has also been applied to defining the genome-wide chromatin accessibility landscape in human cancers, and revealing an overall decrease in chromatin accessibility in macular degeneration. Computational footprinting methods can be performed on ATAC-seq to find cell specific binding sites and transcription factors with cell specific activity.

Single-cell ATAC-seq 
Modifications to the ATAC-seq protocol have been made to accommodate single-cell analysis. Microfluidics can be used to separate single nuclei and perform ATAC-seq reactions individually. With this approach, single cells are captured by either a microfluidic device or a liquid deposition system before tagmentation. An alternative technique that does not require single cell isolation is combinatorial cellular indexing. This technique uses barcoding to measure chromatin accessibility in thousands of individual cells; it can generate epigenomic profiles from 10,000-100,000 cells per experiment. But combinatorial cellular indexing requires additional, custom-engineered equipment or a large quantity of custom, modified Tn5. Recently, a pooled barcode method called sci-CAR was developed, allowing joint profiling of chromatin accessibility and gene expression of single cells.

Computational analysis of scATAC-seq is based on construction of a count matrix with number of reads per open chromatin regions. Open chromatin regions can be defined, for example, by standard peak calling of pseudo bulk ATAC-seq data. Further steps include data reduction with PCA and clustering of cells. scATAC-seq matrices can be extremely large (hundreds of thousands of regions) and is extremely sparse, i.e. less than 3% of entries are non-zero. Therefore, imputation of count matrix is another crucial step by using methods as non-negative matrix factorization. As with bulk ATAC-seq, scATAC-seq allows finding regulators like transcription factors controlling gene expression of cells. This can be achieved by looking at the number of reads around TF motifs or footprinting analysis.

References

External source
 ATAC-seq probes open-chromatin state (figure)
 ATAC-seq: Fast and sensitive epigenomic profiling
 HINT-ATAC: Identification of Transcription Factor Binding Sites using ATAC-seq

Molecular biology techniques